Lesnoye Ukolovo is a rural locality (a selo) and the administrative center of Lesnoukolovskoye Rural Settlement, Krasnensky District, Belgorod Oblast, Russia. The population was 864 as of 2010. There are 22 streets.

Geography 
Lesnoye Ukolovo is located 13 km east of Krasnoye (the district's administrative centre) by road. Goncharovka is the nearest rural locality.

References 

Rural localities in Krasnensky District